Dream of You is the debut solo album by Sharon Corr, who found success earlier with her siblings in The Corrs. The album was released on 10 September 2010 in Ireland and 13 September 2010 in the United Kingdom.

Background
The first single, "It's Not a Dream", was released a year earlier on 28 August 2009 and peaked at No. 29 on the Irish Singles Chart. On 6 September 2010, Corr's cover of The Korgis song "Everybody's Got to Learn Sometime" was released as the second single. The album cover art and track listing was revealed on 30 July 2010 through Corr's official website. A third single, "So Long Ago", was released to radio in December 2010.

To promote the album, Corr embarked on the Dream of You Tour in August 2011. The album was digitally re-released with two bonus tracks, including the promotional radio single "Over It", on 26 July to coincide with this. Another bonus track, "Someone Else's Lover", was made available from the official store of Corr's website.

Track listing
All songs written by Sharon Corr, except where noted.

Release history

References

2010 debut albums
Sharon Corr albums
Rhino Records albums
Warner Records albums